Bhatgaon Vidhan Sabha Constituency is one of the 90 Vidhan Sabha (Legislative Assembly) constituencies of Chhattisgarh state in central India. This vidhan sabha consists of Bhaiyathan, Bishrampur, Bhatgaon, Jarhi, Surajpur.

Members of Legislative Assembly

Election results

2018

See also
Telgaon

References

Assembly constituencies of Chhattisgarh
Surajpur district